The Cake Sale are a collective of mostly Irish musical artists including Swedish singer/songwriter Nina Persson of The Cardigans and Australian musician Nick Seymour of Crowded House.

The collective was formed by Brian Crosby formerly of Bell X1. They came together in 2006 to release a self-titled album called The Cake Sale. The album was produced to raise money for the charity Oxfam Ireland and the Ireland Make Trade Fair campaign. It was released on 3 November 2006 in Ireland. The album was so successful that it was given an international release the following year; it was released on 10 September 2007 in the United Kingdom and on 16 October 2007 in the United States by the American indie label Yep Roc Records, which is based in North Carolina.

Album details

The album, The Cake Sale was recorded by a group of Irish and international musicians who were organised by Crosby in 2006 to raise funds for the charity Oxfam Ireland's Make Trade Fair campaign. Proceeds are added to the charity's "unrestricted fund" to support projects in ten African countries, countries such as Tanzania, Malawi, Uganda and Sudan. Crosby has said that the album's success "completely exceeded expectations", with the artists initially hoping it would go gold just to cover their costs. All the publishing royalties raised by the album benefit Oxfam as well, an unusual occurrence for a charity album. Worldwide rights were negotiated and a label, Oxfam Publishing, was established to administer the royalties. Oxfam Ireland had little experience in such dealings and left it to the musicians to negotiate the project. Crosby says the album's success has raised the charity's profile and high sales at home led to it being released digitally in the United Kingdom on 10 September and in the United States on Yep Roc Records on 16 October 2007.

International success
The song "Some Surprise", a duet between singer-songwriter Lisa Hannigan and Snow Patrol frontman Gary Lightbody which was written by Bell X1 frontman Paul Noonan, featured on an episode of the popular prime time U.S. medical drama television series Grey's Anatomy after which it was made available to download on iTunes. The song was also performed live by the duo for the first and only time at the 2008 Meteor Awards. It is the fourth track on The Cake Sale album.

Contributors
Contributing artists in the collective have included:

 David Geraghty - Bell X1
 Emm Gryner
 Paul Noonan - Bell X1
 Glen Hansard - The Frames, The Swell Season
 Ollie Cole - Turn
 Damien Rice
 Colm Mac Con Iomaire - The Frames
 Conor Deasy - The Thrills
 Matt Lunson
 Lisa Hannigan - former vocalist for Damien Rice
 Nina Persson - The Cardigans, A Camp
 Gary Lightbody - Snow Patrol
 Gemma Hayes
 Rob Bochnik - The Frames
 Josh Ritter
 Neil Hannon - The Divine Comedy
 Graham Hopkins - Therapy?, The Frames
 Nick Seymour - Crowded House

References

External links
 

Irish pop music groups
Musical collectives
Musical groups established in 2006